Grand View-on-Hudson is a village incorporated in 1918 in the town of Orangetown in Rockland County, New York, United States. It is located north of Piermont, east of Orangeburg, south of South Nyack, and west of the Hudson River. The population was 285 at the 2010 census. The name is derived from the scenic view from its location.

Geography
Grand View-on-Hudson is located at  (41.068352, -73.921298).

The village lies on the west bank of the Hudson River.

Demographics

At the 2000 census there were 284 people, 132 households, and 81 families in the village. The population density was 1,699.1 people per square mile (645.0/km). There were 138 housing units at an average density of 825.6 per square mile (313.4/km).  The racial makeup of the village was 93.66% White, 0.35% African American, 3.87% Asian, and 2.11% from two or more races. Hispanic or Latino of any race were 1.41%.

Of the 132 households 24.2% had children under the age of 18 living with them, 53.8% were married couples living together, 7.6% had a female householder with no husband present, and 38.6% were non-families. 26.5% of households were one person and 13.6% were one person aged 65 or older. The average household size was 2.15 and the average family size was 2.60.

The age distribution was 15.8% under the age of 18, 2.1% from 18 to 24, 21.5% from 25 to 44, 39.4% from 45 to 64, and 21.1% 65 or older. The median age was 49 years. For every 100 females, there were 93.2 males. For every 100 females age 18 and over, there were 91.2 males.

The median household income was $130,747 and the median family income  was $157,500. Males had a median income of $97,269 versus $77,403 for females. The per capita income for the village was $84,707. None of the families and 1.4% of the population were living below the poverty line.

Landmark
 Former Wayside Chapel Historic Chapel 1867-1869 (NRHP)

Notable people 
 Stephen Baldwin
 Thomas Berger
 Betty Friedan
 Toni Morrison
 Charles Samuels
 Matthew Winkler
 Greg Wyatt

In popular culture
A fictionalized version of the town appeared in the paranormal television series Ghost Whisperer, which aired from 2005-2010.  Creator John Gray grew up in Brooklyn, New York, which is not far from the actual Grand View-On-Hudson, west of the Hudson River. Piermont is often referenced in episodes as a neighboring town, which is accurate to real life. In the series, Professor Rick Payne worked at the fictional "Rockland University"; Grand-View-On-Hudson is located in Rockland County, New York.

References

External links
 Village of Grand View-on-Hudson official website

Villages in New York (state)
Villages in Rockland County, New York
New York (state) populated places on the Hudson River
Populated places established in 1918
1918 establishments in New York (state)